Gran Hermano 6 is the sixth season of the reality television series Gran Hermano which was broadcast in Spain on Telecinco and La Siete and produced by Endemol. Season 6 lasted for 110 days from September 5, 2004 to December 23, 2004. Juan José Rocamora emerged as the winner.

Summary 

Start Date: September 5, 2004
End Date: December 23, 2004

Duration: 110 days

The Finalists: 3 - Juanjo (The Winner), Conrad Chase  (Runner-up) and Natacha (3rd)

Evicted Housemates: 10 - Beatriz, Cristal, Diana, Eloisa, Eva, Jani, Jonathan, Miguel, Nicky and Salva

Voluntary Exits: 3 - Ángel, Mercedes and Sandra

Mercedes was in Aventura en África on 2005.

In 2010, season "Gran Hermano: El Reencuentro" (All Stars), Nicky, Cristal and Beatriz return at the house.

Beatriz González-Rico was in Supervivientes: Perdidos en Nicaragua on 2010.

Contestants in eviction order

Nominations Table 
Housemates could Nominate three other Housemates for three, two and one points. The three or more Housemates with the most Nomination Points will face the Public Vote. Each week the Head of Household (marked in green) has the chance to save a Housemate from the Nomination line-up. If there are only two Housemates nominated after the Head of Household saves someone, the person(s) with the next highest point total will face the public vote as well.

Notes

2004 Spanish television seasons
GH 6